The STZ-5 artillery tractor was a product of the Stalingrad Tractor Factory (STZ) (Russian: Сталинградский тракторный завод) from 1937 to 1942 in the Soviet Union. The tractor was designed to tow division to corps level guns and howitzers of 8 tonnes and less. The STZ-5 was one of the few artillery tractors specifically designed by the Soviet government for its role. With over 9900 built, it was the most-produced Soviet ‘military’ tractor during the war.

Description 
The STZ-5 features a fully enclosed metal, two person crew compartment (cab over engine design) with a flat wood cargo bed with drop down wood side walls. The MA-1 multifuel engine (7.4 L. 4 in-line cylinders) was rated at 52HP (38.8 kW) at 1250 rpm. The STZ-5 was rated to carry 1.5 tonnes of cargo on its bed or tow 8 tonnes or less. Under optimum conditions its 6 gear transmission (5 forward, 1 reverse) could yield a maximum speed of 25 km/h (15 mph). It had an operational range of 140 km.

Development 
The STZ-5 was designed at the Stalingrad tractor factory with initial work on the project beginning in 1933. The designers borrowed elements and ideas from the British Vickers-Carden-Loyd light tank and the American International Harvester TA-40 agricultural tractor. Their design goal was to achieve a vehicle capable of acting as a military (towing) tractor and a civilian agricultural tractor. They developed two vehicles on the same chassis and engine, the STZ NATI 1TA (STZ-3) agricultural tractor and the STZ NATI 2TB (STZ-5) military transport. The vehicles were submitted for trial in 1935 and were approved however design refinements for mass production were continued until 1937 when mass production began.

Operational notes 

The STZ-5 was designated to tow division level to corps level guns, howitzers and anti-aircraft guns.

This prime mover was praised for its reliability and good cross country ability. It was criticized for having low power, a narrow track and high ground pressure, which would have led to poor performance in snow and mud.

A small number of these vehicles had the 132mm rocket launcher system attached (BM-13-16). While not a common Soviet weapon system these variants of the STZ-5 were used at the battles around Moscow in 1941 and Stalingrad in 1942.

The German army readily pressed captured STZ-5 tractors into service and designated them as CT3-601(r).

Specifications 
 Factory: STZ (Stalingradsky Traktorny Zavod)
 Years Produced: 1937-1942
 Number produced: 9944
 Military service: 1937- 1945
 Length: 4.15 m
 Width: 1.855 m
 Height: 2.36 m
 Ground clearance: 29 cm
 Wading depth: 0.8 m
 Engine: 1MA (7.46 L In-line 4 cylinder petrol), 38.8 kW (52 hp) at 1250 rpm.
 Range: 145 km
 Maximum speed: 25 km/h
 Weight: 5840 kg
 Transport mass: 1.5t
 Towable mass: 4.5 to 7.25t

References

External links 

Engines of the Red Army – STZ-5 page, http://www.o5m6.de/stz-5.html  Retrieved April 2015
"STZ-5 "Stalingradec"" http://www.autogallery.org.ru/m/stz5.htm Retrieved April 2016

Artillery tractors
Tracked self-propelled rocket launchers
Military vehicles introduced in the 1930s